Dominik Meffert and Philipp Oswald were the defending champions, but did not compete.

Pierre-Hugues Herbert and Adil Shamasdin won the title, defeating Stephan Fransen and Jesse Huta Galung in the final, 6–3, 7–6(7–5).

Seeds

Draw

Draw

External Links
 Main Draw

Tunis Openandnbsp;- Doubles
2014 Doubles